Kelly Cook is a former running back in the National Football League.

Biography
Cook was born Kelly Edward Cook on August 20, 1962 in Cushing, Oklahoma.

Career
Cook played with the Green Bay Packers during the 1987 NFL season. He played at the collegiate level at Oklahoma State University-Stillwater.

See also
List of Green Bay Packers players

References

People from Cushing, Oklahoma
Green Bay Packers players
American football running backs
Players of American football from Oklahoma
Oklahoma State Cowboys football players
Living people
1962 births